The 1991 TCU Horned Frogs football team represented Texas Christian University (TCU) in the 1991 NCAA Division I-A football season. The Horned Frogs finished the season 7–4 overall and 4–4 in the Southwest Conference. The team was coached by Jim Wacker, in his ninth and final year as head coach. The Frogs played their home games in Amon G. Carter Stadium, which is located on campus in Fort Worth, Texas.

Following the 1990 NCAA Division I-A football season, TCU replaced the existing upper-deck seating area of Amon G. Carter stadium with aluminum bleacher seating. The new designed reduced the official seating capacity of the stadium from 46,083 to 44,008. Additionally, TCU replaced the field's artificial turf with natural grass.

Schedule

Roster

References

TCU
TCU Horned Frogs football seasons
TCU Horned Frogs football